Gemma Jayne Evans (born 1 August 1996) is a Welsh footballer who plays as a defender and forward for the Wales national team. She currently plays for Reading F.C. Women in the FA WSL.

Early life
Evans was born and raised in Gelli, Rhondda. She starting playing football at age 10 for a local team named Ton & Gelli. At 13, she switched to playing for an all-girls team, Ferndale Fillies which was later renamed Cambrian and then subsequently changed to Valleys United.  She then went on to play for Port Talbot Town Ladies for two years

Playing career

Club
Evans played for Cardiff City L.F.C. from 2015–2017. She joined FA WSL 1 side Yeovil Town on 6 September 2017, alongside Welsh international teammate Chloe Lloyd.

She signed for FA WSL side Bristol City on 20 July 2018.

She signed for FA WSL side Reading F.C. Women on 5 July 2021.

International
Evans competed for Wales in the qualifying stages of the UEFA Women's Euro 2016.  In 2017, she played in Wales' 1–0 wins over Kazakhstan and Bosnia and Herzegovina in UEFA Group 1 of the 2019 FIFA Women's World Cup qualification.

Personal life 
Evans holds a degree from the University of South Wales.

Career statistics

References

External links
 
 
 

1996 births
Living people
Welsh women's footballers
Wales women's international footballers
Yeovil Town L.F.C. players
Cardiff City Ladies F.C. players
Women's association football defenders
Women's association football forwards